A total lunar eclipse will take place on July 29, 2083. The Moon will be plunged into darkness for 1 hour and 30 minutes, in a deep total eclipse which will see the Moon 48.3% of its diameter inside the Earth's umbral shadow. The visual effect of this depends on the state of the Earth's atmosphere, but the Moon may be stained a deep red colour. The partial eclipse will last for 3 hours and 33 minutes in total.

The northern tip of the moon will pass through the center of the Earth's shadow. This is the last central lunar eclipse of Saros cycle 130.

Visibility

Related lunar eclipses

Saros series

Half-Saros cycle
A lunar eclipse will be preceded and followed by solar eclipses by 9 years and 5.5 days (a half saros). This lunar eclipse is related to two annular solar eclipses of Solar Saros 137.

See also 
List of lunar eclipses
List of 21st-century lunar eclipses

Notes

External links
 

2083-07
2083-07
2083 in science
Central total lunar eclipses